Kate Leanne Longhurst (born 2 May 1989) is an English footballer who plays as a midfielder or wing-back for West Ham United in the FA WSL.

Club career

Longhurst began her career with Colchester United. In the 2007–08 season, she scored 15 goals in 21 appearances. The following season, she scored 3 goals in 11 appearances. In 2009, she joined top-flight side Watford and finished the 2009–10 season with 3 goals in 17 matches. At the end of the season, she signed with Millwall Lionesses.

In 2011, Longhurst joined Chelsea. She scored the Blues' second goal in the 101st minute in the 2012 FA Women's Cup Final.

Longhurst signed with Liverpool in 2013, helping the side to back-to-back FA WSL titles in 2013 and 2014. On 22 May 2018, she left Liverpool following the expiration of her contract.

On 9 August 2018, Longhurst joined West Ham United. On 23 September, Longhurst scored West Ham's first ever FA WSL goal, in a 4–3 defeat to Arsenal.

International career
Longhurst represented England at various youth levels. In 2006, she partnered Ellen White in the Nationwide Under-17 Tournament final as she netted for England in a 2–0 win over Scotland.

Honours

Club
Liverpool
 FA WSL: 2013, 2014

Chelsea

 Women's FA Cup Runners-up 2012

West Ham United

 Women's FA Cup Runners-up 2019

Individual

 Fans hammer of the year 2020 & 2022
 Players Player 2020 & 2022
 Coaches player 2022

References

External links

 
 Kate Longhurst at West Ham United
 Kate Longhurst at Liverpool
 

1989 births
Living people
English women's footballers
Women's association football midfielders
Women's association football forwards
Liverpool F.C. Women players
Chelsea F.C. Women players
Women's Super League players
West Ham United F.C. Women players
People from Witham